Svend Frederiksen (7 May 1916 – 20 June 1985) was a Danish footballer. He played in two matches for the Denmark national football team in 1941.

References

External links
 

1916 births
1985 deaths
Danish men's footballers
Denmark international footballers
Place of birth missing
Association footballers not categorized by position